Undone is the first live album by Brian & Jenn Johnson. The album was released in 2001 by Bethel Music and Kingsway Music. Matthew Donovan worked on the production of the album. Leah Märi also featured on the album.

Critical reception

Chris Coupe, in a review for Cross Rhythms, rated the album eight out of ten squares, saying that the album "demonstrates many of the strengths which make the worship emanating from Bethel Church stand out from the crowd." Bestowing the album a score of nine out of ten at Eden.co.uk, Sam Hailes says "Undone is like watching a live worship event from behind the scenes" and that the album wins the "authenticity prize".

Track listing

Release history

References

2001 live albums
Brian & Jenn Johnson albums